Domates mücveri are fried tomato balls served as an appetizer on the Turkey. The dish is made from crushed or pureed tomatoes fried in oil. The batter is tomatoes and flour kneaded into a dough along with spices, parsley, onion, and mint; the dough is then fried in cooking oil and served as an appetizer.

See also

 Mücver
 Latke

References 

Ottoman cuisine
Turkish cuisine
Tomato dishes
Vegan cuisine
Fritters